Leptothorax recedens is a species of ant in the family Formicidae. It is found in France, Italy, and Spain, with the most recent finding in Slovenia.

In his 2003 revision of the family Formicidae, Bolton placed this species in the genus Temnothorax, although many authors still use the original classification.

Conservation status
It is the only IUCN evaluated hymenopteran species listed as "Least concern", although its status hasn't been re-evaluated at least since 2000.

References

recedens
Hymenoptera of Europe
Insects described in 1856
Taxa named by William Nylander (botanist)
Taxonomy articles created by Polbot